Khaled Ibrahim (born 17 January 1997) is an Emirati footballer who plays as a right-back for Sharjah.

References

External links
 

Emirati footballers
1997 births
Living people
Dibba FC players
Al Wahda FC players
Baniyas Club players
Sharjah FC players
UAE Pro League players
Association football defenders
Footballers at the 2018 Asian Games
Asian Games bronze medalists for the United Arab Emirates
Asian Games medalists in football
Medalists at the 2018 Asian Games